Road signs in Italy conform to the general pattern of those used in most other European countries, with the notable exception that the background of motorway (autostrada) signs is green and those for 'normal' roads is blue. They are regulated by the Codice della Strada (Road Code) and by the Regolamento di Attuazione del Codice della Strada (Rules for the Implementation of the Road Code) in conformity with the Vienna Convention on Road Signs and Signals.

Design
Distances and other measurements are displayed in metric units.

Warning signs are usually placed 150 metres before the area they're referring to; if they're farther or nearer, an additional sign displays the actual distance in metres. Prohibition signs and mandatory instruction signs, instead, are placed exactly at the beginning of the area of validity.

Colours and shapes
Signs follow the general European conventions concerning the use of shape and colour to indicate function of signs:

Colours of directional road signs
 On motorways, directional signs are green with white lettering.
 On main roads, directional signs with more than one destination are blue with white lettering.
 Within cities, directional signs with more than one destination are white with black lettering.
On main roads and within cities, the colour of a directional sign with a single destination depends on the type of destination:
 if the destination is a city that is reached by means of a motorway, the sign is green and carries the motorway name as well as the destination
 in the other cases when the destination is a city, the sign is blue
 if the destination is a city district, a hospital or an airport, the sign is white
 if the destination is a tourist attraction, the sign is brown

Typeface

A version of the Transport typeface employed on road signs in the UK, called Alfabeto Normale, is used on Italian road signs. A condensed version, called Alfabeto Stretto, is also used for long names that wouldn't fit. Each name uses one font, but names in Alfabeto Normale and in Alfabeto Stretto can co-exist on one sign.

The font is officially regulated by the 1992 Codice della Strada, article 39 section 125. It defines both Alfabeto Normale and Alfabeto Stretto for uppercase letters, lowercase letters and digits, "positive" (dark on light background) and "negative" (light on dark background). However, there are regulations about the use of Alfabeto Normale dating back to 1969.

Uppercase is used in most cases. Lowercase is sometimes used for city districts and tourist attractions.

Language
The standard language is Italian. In some autonomous regions or provinces bilingual signs are used (mainly Italian/German in South Tyrol, Italian/French in Aosta Valley and Italian/Slovenian along the Slovenian border, but also Italian/Friulan in the Friuli historical region and Italian/Sardinian in Sardinia).
These are some examples of the italian sign "Passo carrabile" (No parking in front of vehicular access to the side properties) in the bilingual variants:

Gallery

Warning signs

Temporary signs

Regulatory signs

Priority signs

Prohibition signs

Mandatory signs

Indication signs

Additional panels

Complementary signage

Obsolete signs (No longer used)

Similar systems
 Albania largely shares the same road signage system used in Italy, except that the language used is Albanian instead of Italian. European route numbers are unsigned in Albania, only national designations.
 Sierra Leone largely shares the same road signage system used in Italy, except that the language used is English. The European road network does not serve Sierra Leone.

See also
 Road signs in Europe

References

External links

 Traffic rules in Italian motorways

Italy
Road transport in Italy